Yacouba Moumouni is a Nigerien singer and flautist. As the leader of the jazz-ethnic band Mamar Kassey, he is one of the best-known Nigerien musicians outside Niger. He is from the Songhai ethnic group.

Falling out with his brother, he ran away to the capital, where he lived on the street for two years until his talent attracted the attention of a music teacher, and he was taken on as an apprentice. Mastering the traditional flute, he joined the Ballet National of Niger and then formed Mamar Kassey, an eight-man group featuring Moumouni and guitarist Abdallah Alhassane. Together they have toured West Africa, Europe, and the United States, and have become the most popular musical group in Niger.

See also
Denké-Denké

References
BBC:  Mamar Kassey Alatoumi. Reviewed by Peter Marsh. 20 November 2002.
Afropop Worldwide:  Mamar Kassey Alatoumi. Reviewed by Banning Eyre, 2001.
SONG OF THE SAHEL. Dan Maley, Macon Telegraph (Georgia, USA),2004-09-03, p. 3.

20th-century Nigerien male singers
Living people
Nigerien flautists
Year of birth missing (living people)
21st-century Nigerien male singers
20th-century flautists
21st-century flautists